Kilmer Blaine Corbin (June 18, 1919 – January 7, 1993), was an American politician and attorney who served in the Texas State Senate from 1949 to 1957.

Corbin was the father of actor Barry Corbin.

References

1919 births
1993 deaths
People from Lubbock, Texas
Texas Tech University alumni
University of Texas School of Law alumni
Texas lawyers
Democratic Party Texas state senators
American school principals
People from Lamesa, Texas
20th-century American lawyers
20th-century American politicians